The Kagyu-Dzong center is a Buddhist center in Paris, affiliated to the Karma Kagyu school of Tibetan Buddhism. This center is linked to the 17th Karmapa, Orgyen Trinley Dorje.

History 
It is situated in a temple of Tibetan and Bhutanese style that was inaugurated January 27, 1985, constructed nearby the "Pagode du bois de Vincennes", site of the Institut international bouddhique founded by Jean Sainteny.

In 1980, Kalu Rinpoche conferred in the Pagode du bois de Vincennes the Initiation of Kalachakra. He then met with Jean Ober, the general secretary of the Institut international bouddhique and together, they conceived a project to construct a Tibetan temple. The plans of the temple, established by the architect Jean-Luc Massot on the directives of Kalu Rinpoche, were approved by the Paris city hall.  The first stone was laid on March 20, 1983. The works realized on private founds and with the help of many volunteers took two years.

The Kagyu-Dzong center is linked to the center Vajradhara-Ling in Normandy and Kalu Rinpoche entrusted the responsibility of both centers to his disciple, Lama Gyurme.

Since 2006, each year, an artistic event takes place at Kagyu-Dzong on the theme of "Peace and Light" to support a project of construction of the Temple for Peace nearby the Vajradhara-Ling center.

See also

Orgyen Trinley Dorje
Vajradhara-Ling
Temple for Peace
List of Buddhist temples in France

Notes and references

 Institut Bouddhique Kagyu-Dzong

External links

 Web site of Kagyu-Dzong

Asian diaspora in Paris
Dzongs
Religious buildings and structures in Paris
Buddhist temples in France
Buildings and structures in the 12th arrondissement of Paris
Karma Kagyu monasteries and temples
Tibetan Buddhism in France
Tibetan Buddhist organizations
Religious buildings and structures completed in 2010
21st-century Buddhist temples
21st-century architecture in France